trans-3-Methyl-2-hexenoic acid (TMHA) is an unsaturated short-chain fatty acid that occurs in sweat secreted by the axillary (underarm) apocrine glands of Caucasians and some Asians.

Hexanoic acids such as TMHA have a hircine odor. Of the fatty acids contributing to Caucasian men's underarm odor, TMHA has the most prominent odor.

Schizophrenia odor 
It has long been claimed that schizophrenia patients exhibit a particular peculiar body odor, and it has been postulated the odor may be caused by underlying metabolic abnormalities associated with the condition, among other factors. Initial studies identified the causal component as TMHA, however, subsequent studies failed to reproduce such results, with subsequent researchers suggesting the initial research may have had misidentified impurities in samples as TMHA due to poor methodology. However, a 2007 study found schizophrenia patients to have reduced olfactory sensitivity to TMHA, possibly indicating sensory habituation; the decreased ability to smell the substance due to the presence of the substance as a constant component of subjects' own sweat and body odor. Furthermore, the researchers noted a positive association between reduced ability to smell TMHA and greater severity of disorganised and negative symptoms.

An allusion to TMHA and its purported link to the smell of the mentally ill is made in the 1996 David Foster Wallace novel, Infinite Jest, and in the 1988 novel The Silence of the Lambs by Thomas Harris.

References

Fatty acids
Enoic acids